Sfax Railway Sport (often referred to as Railway or ٍُSRS) is a Tunisian football club from Sfax founded in 1920.

The club have been champions three times and were in the top division for 33 seasons. However, but 1994–95 was their last season in the top flight and today they play in Ligue Professionnelle 2

Stadium

 ¹ Picture of the Stadium of SRS Ameur Gargouri.

Honours
Tunisian Ligue Professionnelle 1: 3
1933–34, 1952–53, 1967–68

Tunisian Cup: 0
 Runners-up : 1954–55, 1967–68, 1978–79
Tunisian Ligue Professionnelle 2: 2
1993–94
1962–63 (south group)

Youth
U21 Championship: 2
1967, 1989

U21 Cup: 1
1989

U18 Championship: 1
1986

U18 Cup: 2
1985, 1988

Football clubs in Tunisia
Association football clubs established in 1920
1920 establishments in Tunisia
Sports clubs in Tunisia
Railway association football teams